Nelson Ighodaro Abbey (born 28 August 2003) is an English footballer who plays as a defender for  side Reading.

Club career
Abbey made his debut for Reading on 15 September 2020 as a substitute in a 1–0 EFL Cup defeat to Luton Town. Abbey signed his first professional contract with Reading on 15 December 2020, until the summer of 2022.

International career
Abbey was born in England and is of Nigerian descent. He was called up to the England under-17 squad in February 2020. He has made 3 appearances for England at under-17 level.

Career statistics

References

2003 births
Living people
English footballers
English people of Nigerian descent
Association football defenders
Reading F.C. players
England youth international footballers